= Booth's Music =

Booth's Music is a music retail outlet in the oldest part of Bolton town centre, Churchgate, UK. The store sells sheet music, instruments and accessories and offers music tuition and repairs and servicing to instruments. It also features a recording studio.

== History ==
James Booth established Booth's Music on Hotel Street in 1832. The store was later moved to Churchgate. It is one of the oldest family businesses in the Bolton area, and among the oldest music retail shops in the world.

Booth's has remained in the same family, with Mr. James Booth being the great, great, great, great-grandfather of the present owners. The shop operates from premises on Churchgate, in a neighbourhood with an extensive history.

Booth's sells and services, and gives advice about instruments of all origins including guitars, brass and woodwind, percussion, folk and ethnic instruments and stringed instruments. In recent years, tuition has been offered in studios built onto the shop premises and the business also includes a recording studio under the name of "Talent Pool"

Booth's Music were at one time sponsors of the Wanderers Premier League football team.

Booth's Music presents local concerts featuring amateur and professional musicians, and organizes other local events related to music and musicians. In 2012 the store organized a neighbourhood festival to celebrate 180 years in business.
